Coon Chicken Inn was an American chain of three restaurants that was founded by Maxon Lester Graham and Adelaide Burt in 1925, which prospered until the late 1950s. The restaurant's name contained the word Coon, considered a racial slur, and the trademarks and entrances of the restaurants were designed to look like a smiling caricature of an African-American porter.  The smiling capped porter head also appeared on menus, dishes, and promotional items. Due to changes in popular culture and the general consideration of being culturally and racially offensive, the chain was closed by 1957.

The first Coon Chicken Inn was opened in suburban Salt Lake City, Utah, in 1925. In 1929, another restaurant was opened in then-suburban Lake City, Seattle, and a third was opened in the Hollywood District of Portland, Oregon, in 1931.  A fourth location was advertised but never opened in Spokane, Washington. Later, a cabaret, orchestra, and catering were added to the Seattle and Salt Lake restaurants. The Portland location at 5474 NE Sandy Blvd. closed in 1949 and was converted into another restaurant, and is currently the location of Clyde's Prime Rib. The Seattle location also closed in 1949 and is no longer standing. That address at 8500 Lake City Way is now occupied by The Growler Guys restaurant. The Salt Lake City location at 2960 S. (sometimes listed as 2950 S.) Highland Drive closed in 1957 and is now the site of a furniture store.

Popular culture
An antique promotional poster for Coon Chicken Inn featured as a plot device in the 2001 black comedy film Ghost World.

The Company plays a role in the Alternate History mocumentary C.S.A.: The Confederate States of America from 2004. It is featured in a number of advertisements, and is believed to have heavily outperformed its real life counterpart. It is implied to have replaced McDonald's and KFC as North America's most known fast food establishment.

See also
 Sambo's restaurant chain
 List of chicken restaurants
 List of defunct restaurants of the United States

References

1925 establishments in Utah
1957 disestablishments in Utah
American companies established in 1925
American companies disestablished in 1957
Restaurants established in 1925
Restaurants disestablished in 1957
African-American history of Utah
Buildings and structures in Salt Lake City
Chicken chains of the United States
Defunct restaurant chains in the United States
Defunct restaurants in Portland, Oregon
History of racism in Oregon
History of racism in Utah
History of racism in Washington (state)
History of Salt Lake City
Hollywood, Portland, Oregon
Restaurants in Utah
Restaurants in Washington (state)
Companies based in Salt Lake City
Stereotypes of African Americans
Utah culture